The Sparta was a three-stage rocket that launched Australia's first Earth satellite, WRESAT, on 29 November  1967.

Sparta used a surplus American Redstone as its first stage, an Antares-2 as a second stage, and a BE-3 as a third stage. Several Spartas were launched from 1966–67 from Woomera Test Range in Woomera, South Australia as part of a joint United States–United Kingdom–Australian research program aimed at understanding re-entry phenomena, and the U.S. donated a spare for the scientific satellite launch into polar orbit.

The first stage was recovered from the Simpson Desert in 1990 after being found in searches by explorer Dick Smith the previous year.

References

Space launch vehicles of the United States
Sounding rockets